Chi Biqing (1917–2007) was a People's Republic of China politician. He was born in Pingding County, Shanxi Province. He was Chinese Communist Party Committee Secretary and CPPCC Chairman of Guizhou. He was a member of the Central Advisory Commission, 11th Central Committee of the Chinese Communist Party and 12th Central Committee of the Chinese Communist Party.

1917 births
2007 deaths
People's Republic of China politicians from Shanxi
Chinese Communist Party politicians from Shanxi
Political office-holders in Guizhou
Members of the 12th Central Committee of the Chinese Communist Party
CPPCC Chairmen of Guizhou
Members of the Central Advisory Commission
Members of the 11th Central Committee of the Chinese Communist Party
Communist Party Committee Secretaries of Taiyuan
Politicians from Yangquan